Robert Nosse (born 1967) is an American politician who serves as a member of the Oregon House of Representatives. He represents District 42, which includes parts of Southeast and Northeast Portland.

Early life and education

Rob Nosse was born in Ohio and is of Slovenian descent. He attended and graduated from Miami University of Ohio. He moved to Oregon in 1992 to lead the Oregon Student Association. He is a labor organizer for the Oregon Nurses Association

Political career

Nosse announced his candidacy for the District 42 seat in the Oregon House of Representatives in 2013 after the incumbent, Jules Bailey, chose to run for a seat on the Multnomah County Commission. In the May 2014 primary election, Nosse defeated five other candidates for the Democratic nomination, winning 48.9 percent of the vote. Nosse did not face a Republican opponent in the November 2014 election.

After the May 2014 election, Jules Bailey resigned from the Oregon House of Representatives to assume his new position as a County Commissioner. The Multnomah County Commission appointed Nosse to the seat for the remainder of Bailey's term, allowing Nosse to take office immediately while running for election to a full term. Nosse was elected to a term in his own right in November 2014.

Personal life 
Nosse is openly gay and lives in southeast Portland with his husband, Jim Laden. The couple have two children and one grandchild.

See also 
 77th Oregon Legislative Assembly (2013–2014)

References

External links
 Legislative website
 Project VoteSmart biography
 Campaign website

Democratic Party members of the Oregon House of Representatives
Politicians from Portland, Oregon
1967 births
Living people
Miami University alumni
People from Marion, Ohio
21st-century American politicians
LGBT state legislators in Oregon